The Paleoproterozoic Era (also spelled Palaeoproterozoic), spanning the time period from  (2.5–1.6 Ga), is the first of the three sub-divisions (eras) of the Proterozoic Eon. The Paleoproterozoic is also the longest era of the Earth's geological history. It was during this era that the continents first stabilized.

Paleontological evidence suggests that the Earth's rotational rate ~1.8 billion years ago equated to 20-hour days, implying a total of ~450 days per year.

Atmosphere 
Before the enormous increase in atmospheric oxygen, almost all existing lifeforms were anaerobic organisms whose metabolism was based on a form of cellular respiration that did not require oxygen. Free oxygen in large amounts is toxic to most anaerobic organisms. Consequently, most died when the atmospheric free oxygen levels soared in an extinction event called the Great Oxidation Event, which brought atmospheric oxygen levels to up to 10% of their current level. The only creatures that survived were either resistant to the oxidizing and poisonous effects of oxygen or sequestered in oxygen-free environments. The sudden increase of atmospheric free oxygen and the ensuing extinction of the vulnerable lifeforms is widely considered one of the first and most significant mass extinctions on Earth.

Emergence of Eukarya 

Many crown node eukaryotes (from which the modern-day eukaryotic lineages would have arisen) have been approximately dated to around the time of the Paleoproterozoic Era.
While there is some debate as to the exact time at which eukaryotes evolved,
current understanding places it somewhere in this era. Statherian fossils from the Changcheng Group of North China provide evidence that eukaryotic life was already diverse during the late Palaeoproterozoic.

Geological events 
During this era, the earliest global-scale continent-continent collision belts developed. The associated continent and mountain building events are represented by the 2.1–2.0 Ga Trans-Amazonian and Eburnean orogens in South America and West Africa; the ~2.0 Ga Limpopo Belt in southern Africa; the 1.9–1.8 Ga Trans-Hudson, Penokean, Taltson–Thelon, Wopmay, Ungava and Torngat orogens in North America, the 1.9–1.8 Ga Nagssugtoqidian Orogen in Greenland; the 1.9–1.8 Ga Kola–Karelia, Svecofennian, Volhyn-Central Russian, and Pachelma orogens in Baltica (Eastern Europe); the 1.9–1.8 Ga Akitkan Orogen in Siberia; the ~1.95 Ga Khondalite Belt; the ~1.85 Ga Trans-North China Orogen in North China; and the 1.8-1.6 Ga Yavapai and Mazatzal orogenies in southern North America.

That pattern of collision belts supports the formation of a Proterozoic supercontinent named Columbia or Nuna. That continental collisions suddenly led to mountain building at large scale is interpreted as having resulted from increased biomass and carbon burial during and after the Great Oxidation Event: Subducted carbonaceous sediments are hypothesized to have lubricated compressive deformation and led to crustal thickening.

Felsic volcanism in what is now northern Sweden led to the formation of the Kiruna and Arvidsjaur porphyries.

The lithospheric mantle of Patagonia's oldest blocks formed.

See also

References

External links
 EssayWeb Paleoproterozoic Era
 First breath: Earth's billion-year struggle for oxygen New Scientist, #2746, 5 February 2010 by Nick Lane. Posits an earlier much longer snowball period, c2.4 - c2.0 Gya, triggered by the Great Oxygenation Event.
 The information on eukaryotic lineage diversification was gathered from a New York Times opinion blog by Olivia Judson. See the text here: .
 Paleoproterozoic (chronostratigraphy scale)

 
Geological eras